Tracey Dares MacNeil is a pianist from Cape Breton, Nova Scotia. She performed in Natalie MacMaster's band for several years, including recording for MacMaster's mid-1990s albums My Roots are Showing, No Boundaries and Fit as a Fiddle.

She is married to piper Paul K. MacNeil, and with him established the Castlebay Music online retail business specialising in Atlantic Canada music artists. The pair performed together on the CD Còmhla Cruinn – Gathered Together,

Discography
1994: Crooked Lake
2000: Castlebaymusic.com with Paul MacNeil

References

External links
 Castle Bay Music
 Cape Breton Music: Tracey Dares MacNeil

Dares, Tracey
Year of birth missing (living people)
Dares, Tracey